Belić is a village in the municipality of Valjevo, Serbia. According to the 2011 census, the village has a population of 109 inhabitants.

Population

References

Populated places in Kolubara District